Tillberg Peak is a largely ice-free peak, 610 m, at the northeast extremity of Kyustendil Ridge on the east coast of Graham Land, Antarctica.

The name Tillberg was given to a group of four rocky outcrops in this area but, since they are not conspicuous topographically, the United Kingdom Antarctic Place-Names Committee (UK-APC) in 1963 recommended that the name be transferred to this more useful landmark. Named by Otto Nordenskjold after Judge Knut Tillberg, contributor to the Swedish Antarctic Expedition, 1901–04.

Mountains of Graham Land
Nordenskjöld Coast